Glenn Ford (1916–2006) was a Canadian-born American actor.

Glen or Glenn Ford may also refer to:

Crime-related
Glenn Ford (exoneree) (1945–2015), American exonerated after 30 years on death row, accused of 1983 murder in Louisiana
Glen R. Ford, police officer involved in investigating the Norfolk Four, who were accused of 1993 rape and murder in Norfolk, Virginia

Other uses
Glen Ford (journalist) African-American broadcaster and newspaper editor who co-founded the Black Agenda Report
Glen Ford, Leicestershire, original settlement which is now Glen Parva, England
Glen Ford (curler) in 2013 Canadian Direct Insurance BC Men's Curling Championship – Qualification

See also
Glenford (disambiguation)